Nealcidion sexnotatum is a species of beetle in the family Cerambycidae. It was described by Waterhouse in 1901.

References

Nealcidion
Beetles described in 1901